Dalwhinnie distillery, situated in the Highland village of Dalwhinnie in Scotland, produces single malt Scotch whisky. Dalwhinnie refers to its own whisky as a Highland Whisky, as the Speyside region is wholly within the Highlands and so Speyside distilleries can be legally labelled as either Highland or Speyside under SWA regulations. A number of other Speyside distilleries also label their whisky Highland such as Macallan, Glenfarclas and Aberlour (who actually reference both Highland and Speyside on the packaging). Dalwhinnie is owned by Diageo.

History
The site for the distillery was chosen for its access to clear spring water from Lochan-Doire-Uaine and abundant peat from the surrounding bogs.

The name Dalwhinnie is derived from Gaelic word Dail Chuinnidh, which means meeting place, referring to the meeting of ancient cattle drovers' routes through the mountains.

1897: John Grant of Grantown-on-Spey, George Sellar of Kingussie, and designer Alexander Mackenzie, also of Kingussie and already a designer of a distillery there, put up an estimated £10,000 to build the Strathspey Distillery at Dalwhinnie between the Great North Road and the Highland Railway.

1898: In February production begins but by the summer the venture was already in liquidation. In October A. P. Blyth buys the distillery for his son and renames it Dalwhinnie announcing ‘considerable improvements on the building and plant’.

1905: The largest distillers in the United States, Cook and Bernheimer, buy the distillery at auction for just £1,250. Many fear the take-over of the Scotch whisky industry. A huge warehouse in Leith blends Dalwhinnie with other whiskies "to suit the American palate".

1919: Prohibition hits America. Dalwhinnie returns to Scottish hands; they are those of Sir James Calder, chairman of Macdonald Greenlees, also blenders in Leith.

1926: Macdonald Greenlees is itself acquired; by the Distillers Company Ltd. (DCL). Dalwhinnie gains its fifth owner in under thirty years and is licensed to James Buchanan and Co. (famous for the Black and White and Buchanan blends).

1934: A fire in the early hours of 1 February closes the distillery for four years; perhaps coincidentally this is also the year in which electricity first comes to the village, replacing paraffin lamps.

1938: After four years Dalwhinnie re-opens in April, rebuilt and refreshed…

1940: …and shuts again, in common with most distilleries, as a result of wartime restrictions on their use of barley.

1961: The wash stills are converted to steam heating from a coal-fired boiler.

1968: The maltings cease production. Barley is now brought in from specialist maltsters for greater control over peatiness and alcohol yield.

1969: British Rail closes the distillery’s private siding; Dalwhinnie whiskies now leave for the south by road.

1972: Oil-firing replaces coal as modernisation continues.

1987: The distillery becomes part of United Distillers. United Distillers was a Scottish company formed in 1987 combining the businesses of Distillers Company and Arthur Bell & Sons, both owned by Guinness. During a modernisation of the Dalwhinnie plant the traditional worm tubs were removed and shell and tube condensers installed.

1989: Dalwhinnie 15 year old becomes one of the Six Classic Malts of Scotland.

1991: New visitor centre opens.

1994: Dalwhinnie is confirmed by the Met. Office as having the coldest average recorded temperature, of any inhabited region in Scotland and probably the U.K.

1995: Distillery refitted. Traditional worm tubs are reinstated, having been removed several years earlier.

1997: Diageo was formed in 1997 from the merger of Guinness and Grand Metropolitan and Dalwhinnie became part of the drinks giant’s portfolio.

Variants
As of 2019, Dalwhinnie single malt whiskies are available in the following expressions:
 Standard 15-year-old
 More mature 25-, 29- and 36-year-olds
 Distillers Edition
 Winter's Gold

See also
Whisky
Scotch whisky
List of whisky brands
List of distilleries in Scotland

Notes

References

External links
 – official company site

Distilleries in Scotland
Scottish malt whisky
Category B listed buildings in Highland (council area)
Diageo brands